Langtang is a Himalayan valley in Nepal.

Langtang may also refer to:

Langtang, Bagmati, a village in Rasuwa District, Bagmati, Nepal
Langtang, Nigeria, a town in Plateau State, Nigeria
Langtang, Hunan, a town in Xinhua County, Hunan, China

See also
Langtan (disambiguation)